The Men's omnium at the 2013 UCI Track Cycling World Championships was held February 22–23. 19 athletes participated in the contest. The final standings were determined by adding ranks in the six events.

Medalists

Individual event results

Flying Lap
250m flying start; the race was held at 14:30.

Points Race
The points race was 120 laps (30 km) with 12 sprints; the race was held at 15:35.

Elimination Race
An elimination race ended day one; the race was held at 21:45.

Individual Pursuit
4 km individual pursuit started day two; the race was held at 13:55.

Scratch Race
A 15 km scratch race was the second event on day two; the race was held at 16:45.

1 km Time Trial
The last event was 1 km time trial; the race was held at 20:25.

Final standings
The final result after six events.

References

2013 UCI Track Cycling World Championships
UCI Track Cycling World Championships – Men's omnium